Timecop is a 1994 American science fiction action film directed by Peter Hyams and co-written by Mike Richardson and Mark Verheiden. Richardson also served as executive producer. The film is based on Timecop, a story created by Richardson, written by Verheiden, and drawn by Ron Randall, which appeared in the anthology comic Dark Horse Comics, published by Dark Horse Comics.  It is the first installment in the Timecop franchise.

The film stars Jean-Claude Van Damme as Max Walker, a police officer in 1994 and later a U.S. federal agent in 2004, when time travel has been made possible. It also stars Ron Silver as a corrupt politician and Mia Sara as Melissa Walker, the agent's wife. The story follows Walker's life as he fights time-travel crime and investigates the politician's plans.

Timecop remains Van Damme's highest-grossing film as a lead actor (his second to break the $100 million barrier worldwide), having become a cult classic with fans. Although met with mixed reviews, it is generally regarded by critics as one of Van Damme's best films.

Plot
In 1863 Gainesville, Georgia, a time traveller with modern laserdot-equipped machine-pistols slaughters five Confederate States Army soldiers and steals their shipment of gold.

In 1994, the Justice Department sends George Spota to the Senate Appropriations Committee for approval on a secret project: the establishment of the Time Enforcement Commission (TEC) to police the new threat of time travel. Spota convinces them that changes to history are already manifesting, evidenced by arms trafficking shipments paid for in stolen Confederate bullion. Senator Aaron McComb volunteers to chair the oversight committee and Eugene Matuzak is nominated as the TEC's first commissioner. DC Metro Police officer Max Walker considers accepting a position with the TEC. Leaving home, he and his wife Melissa are attacked by unknown assailants. Walker is left for dead as the house explodes, killing Melissa.

Ten years later, Walker is a veteran TEC agent, and is sent back to October 1929 to prevent his former partner Lyle Atwood profiting from the stock market crash. Atwood admits to working for Senator McComb, who is abusing his oversight of time travel technology to raise funds for his upcoming presidential campaign. Fearing McComb will erase him from history, Atwood jumps to his death, but Walker catches him mid-leap and returns them to 2004. Refusing to testify, Atwood is sentenced to death and returned to 1929 to complete his fatal fall. Walker and Matuzak agree McComb is a criminal, but need solid evidence.

Surviving an ambush by McComb’s henchmen, Walker is assigned a new partner, TEC rookie Sarah Fielding. They are sent back to 1994 to investigate McComb, and witness a disagreement with his business partner Jack Parker over manufacturing a new computer chip. They are interrupted by McComb from 2004, who advises his younger self that the chip will become highly profitable. The older McComb warns his younger self that they must not touch because the same matter cannot occupy the same space, then kills Parker. Fielding turns on Walker, revealing she works for McComb. After a shootout with McComb's henchmen, Fielding is wounded and Walker escapes back to 2004.

Arriving in an altered future where McComb is a wealthy presidential frontrunner and has shut down the TEC, Walker appeals to Matuzak, who has no knowledge of the changes to history. They realize that the original time machine prototype was never dismantled and that McComb has access to it, allowing him to neutralize the TEC. Matuzak sends Walker back to the past to restore history, and is shot by agents of the now-corrupt TEC.

Back in 1994, Walker finds Fielding in the hospital. She agrees to testify against McComb, but is murdered in her room. At the hospital, Walker finds a record of a recent visit by Melissa, discovering she was pregnant. Realizing she will be killed that night, he finds her and reveals himself to be from the future, and she agrees to make sure his younger self stays home.

That night, the younger Walker is attacked just as before by McComb's men, but is unknowingly aided by his older self. McComb from 2004 takes Melissa hostage and confronts the older Walker with the bomb that will blow up the house, knowing he will die in the ensuing explosion but satisfied his younger self will become president with Walker gone. However, Walker reveals he has lured the younger McComb to the house; he pushes them together, and the two McCombs merge into a writhing, screaming mass before disappearing from existence. The older Walker escapes with Melissa as the bomb explodes, leaving her beside his unconscious younger self and returning to the future.

Back in 2004, Walker finds the future changed once again: Matuzak and Fielding are alive with the TEC at full strength, while Senator McComb disappeared in 1994. Walker returns home to find Melissa alive and waiting for him, now with their young son.

Cast

Production
Mike Richardson wrote a three-part story titled "Time Cop: A Man Out of Time" that was included in the launch of the Dark Horse Comics anthology series in 1992. Richardson developed the story, while the comic was written by Mark Verheiden and drawn by Ron Randall. The comic told a story of Max Walker, a Time Enforcement Commission agent whose wife is implied to be dead (though the circumstances of this are unknown). Max pursues an illegal time traveler robbing a South African diamond mine in the 1930s. After capturing the robber and returning to present time, Walker realizes the timeline has been damaged because the criminal's robotic bodyguard remained in the past and was still active. Walker returns to the 1930s and defeats the robot with the help of a local whom he rewards with a diamond. Returning home, the timeline is largely restored but readers see the local became a political leader who helped end Apartheid.

Richardson and Verheiden then teamed up to write the screenplay for the movie adaptation.

Music
The musical score of Timecop was composed by Mark Isham and conducted by Ken Kugler.

Soundtrack
 Track listing
 "Time Cop" – 2:20
 "Melissa" – 2:41
 "Blow Up" – 2:12
 "Lasers and Tasers" – 4:23
 "Polaroid" – 6:10
 "Rooftop" – 6:16
 "C4" – 2:37
 "Rescue and Return" – 3:22

Release

Home media
Timecop was first released on VHS on February 21, 1995, LaserDisc on February 28, 1995, and later released on DVD January 20, 1998. The DVD extras include production notes, a theatrical trailer and notes on the cast and crew.

By 2010, the rights to the film had reverted to Largo successor InterMedia, and distribution shifted to Warner Home Video. A Blu-ray of the film was released as a double feature for both this and Bloodsport from Warner Home Video on September 14, 2010, which has the full uncut 98-minute version in 2.35:1 widescreen, but no extra features.

Reception

Box office
Timecop was released in the U.S. on September 16, 1994, where it opened at the number 1 spot with $12,064,625 from 2,228 theaters, and a $5,415 average per theater. In its second week, it took the top spot again with $8,176,615. It finished its run with $45 million in the U.S. In other territories, it grossed about $57 million, for a total worldwide gross of $101 million. This makes it Van Damme's highest-grossing film in which he played the leading role, and his second to make over $100 million overall (after Universal Soldier).

Critical response
On Rotten Tomatoes, the film has a 42% rating based on 45 reviews, with an average rating of 5.2/10. The site's consensus is: "It's no Terminator, but for those willing to suspend disbelief and rational thought, Timecop provides limited sci-fi action rewards." On Metacritic it has a score of 48% based on reviews from 17 critics, indicating "mixed or average reviews". Audiences polled by CinemaScore gave the film an average grade of "B+" on an A+ to F scale.

Critics were mixed on Timecop, citing its various plot holes and inconsistencies. Roger Ebert called Timecop a low-rent Terminator. Richard Harrington of The Washington Post said, "For once, Van Damme's accent is easier to understand than the plot." David Richards of The New York Times disparaged Van Damme's acting and previous films but called Timecop "his classiest effort to date".

The film made Entertainment Weekly's "Underrated Films" list in November 2010, mostly because of Van Damme's acting.

Novelization
In September 1994, a novelization of the film was written by author S.D. Perry was published by Penguin.

Sequel and franchise

The film was followed by a TV series of the same name, running for nine episodes in 1997 on ABC. It starred T.W. King as Jack Logan and Cristi Conaway as Claire Hemmings.

A direct-to-DVD sequel, Timecop 2: The Berlin Decision, was released in 2003, starring Jason Scott Lee and Thomas Ian Griffith, and directed by Steve Boyum. In 2010, Universal Pictures announced a remake of the film, to be written by Mark and Brian Gunn.

The film, which was originally based on a comic, was adapted into a two-issue comic book series of the same name. A game based on the movie was developed by Cryo Interactive and released on the SNES in 1995. Additionally, a series of tie-in novels by author Dan Parkinson published in 1997–1999 featured the Jack Logan character from the television series.

References

External links

 
 
 
 

Timecop (franchise)
1994 films
1990s science fiction action films
American science fiction action films
1990s English-language films
Films directed by Peter Hyams
Films produced by Sam Raimi
Martial arts science fiction films
Films about time travel
Films based on Dark Horse Comics
Live-action films based on comics
Films about widowhood
Films set in Washington, D.C.
Renaissance Pictures productions
Films shot in Vancouver
Films set in 1863
Films set in the 1920s
Films set in 1929
Films set in 1994
Films set in 2004
Films set in the future
Dark Horse Entertainment films
Largo Entertainment films
Films adapted into comics
Films adapted into television shows
Films scored by Mark Isham
1994 martial arts films
1990s American films